Lee Si-woo may refer to:
 Lee Si-woo (volleyball) (born 1994), South Korean male volleyball player
 Lee Si-woo (actress) (born 1997), South Korean actress
 Lee Si-woo (actor) (born 1999), South Korean actor